Daffy Rents is a 1966 Warner Bros. Looney Tunes cartoon directed by Robert McKimson. The short was released on March 26, 1966, and stars Daffy Duck and Speedy Gonzales.

Synopsis
Daffy gets called by the aptly named Dr. Ben Crazy (a parody of the then popular Ben Casey) to remove Speedy from his cats-only nursing home. To do his dirty work for him, Daffy uses his robot Herman to catch Speedy. Unfortunately, Herman proves to be no match for the mouse, (and Speedy's overgrown rat cousin, Ramon) and both he and Daffy eventually give up. When he tries to get his money after getting rid of Speedy, the temperamental Dr. Crazy throws Daffy through the window and out of the office!

The cartoon then closes with Daffy remarking: "Hmmph! It's a sad state of affairs, when a mouse can make a machine turn a duck into a chicken on account of a rat.  Ooh, what a revolting development!"

Voice cast
 Mel Blanc voices Daffy Duck, Speedy Gonzales, Herman, First Nurse
 Gonzales Gonzales voices Dr. Ben Crazy

See also
 List of American films of 1966
 The Golden Age of American animation
 List of Daffy Duck cartoons

References

Lawson, Tim and Alisa Persons. The Magic Behind the Voices: A Who's Who of Cartoon Voice Actors page 58. University Press of Mississippi. 2004. Google Books. Online. July 1, 2008.
New York Times. Online. July 1, 2008.
Showbiz Data Online. July 1, 2008.

External links
 
 

Looney Tunes shorts
1966 films
1966 animated films
1966 short films
1960s Warner Bros. animated short films
Films directed by Robert McKimson
Daffy Duck films
Speedy Gonzales films
1960s American animated films
1960s English-language films